Ghazi Youssef Honeine (born 12 January 1995) is a Lebanese footballer who plays as a midfielder for  club Ansar.

Coming through the youth system, Honeine started his senior career at Ahed in 2012. In 2015 he was sent on a three-year loan to Racing Beirut, playing over 50 games. In 2018 he joined Ansar in a swap deal involving Rabih Ataya. Honeine also represented Lebanon internationally between 2014 and 2016, playing a game at the 2018 FIFA World Cup qualifiers.

Club career

Ahed 
Starting his youth career at Fajr Saida, Honeine moved to Ahed in 2009, winning the youth championship on several occasions. He made his senior debut for Ahed during the 2012–13 season, coming on as a substitute against Safa on 19 May 2013.

Loan to Racing Beirut 
On 25 August 2015, Racing Beirut announced the signing of Honeine on loan. He stayed at the club for three seasons, playing over 50 league games.

Ansar 
On 17 August 2018, Honeine, Hassan Bittar, and Hassan Chaito moved to Ansar from Ahed, with Rabih Ataya moving the other way. On 8 July 2019, Honeine announced his decision to retire from football to pursue a future in mechanical engineering. However, on 7 October Honeine retracted his decision. In 2020–21, he helped Ansar win their first league title since 2007, and their 14th overall. Honeine also helped Ansar win the double, beating Nejmeh in the 2020–21 Lebanese FA Cup final on penalty shoot-outs.

Loan to Tadamon Sour 
On 9 July 2021, Honeine was sent on loan to Tadamon Sour.

International career 
Honeine made his international debut for Lebanon on 9 October 2014, in a friendly against Qatar. He also represented Lebanon at the 2018 FIFA World Cup qualifiers, playing against South Korea on 24 March 2016.

Honours 
Ahed
 Lebanese Premier League: 2014–15
 Lebanese Elite Cup: 2013

Racing Beirut
 Lebanese Challenge Cup: 2016, 2017

Ansar
 Lebanese Premier League: 2020–21
 Lebanese FA Cup: 2020–21
 Lebanese Elite Cup: 2019

References

External links

 
 
 
 
 

1995 births
Living people
People from Sidon
Lebanese footballers
Association football midfielders
Al Ahed FC players
Racing Club Beirut players
Al Ansar FC players
Tadamon Sour SC players
Sagesse SC footballers
Lebanese Premier League players
Lebanon youth international footballers
Lebanon international footballers